The Bombardment of Tangier took place on 6 August 1844, when French Navy forces under the command of François d'Orléans, Prince of Joinville attacked the Moroccan city of Tangier. The campaign was part of the First Franco-Moroccan War.

The bombardment was a consequence of Morocco's alliance with Algeria's Abd-El-Kader against France following several incidents at the border between Algeria and Morocco, and the refusal of Morocco to abandon its support for Algeria.

The Bombardment of Tangier was followed up by the Battle of Isly on 14 August 1844, and the Bombardment of Mogador by the same fleet on 15 August 1844.

Gallery

Notes

History of Tangier
1844 in France
1844 in Morocco
Battles involving France
Battles involving Morocco
Conflicts in 1844
France–Morocco military relations
August 1844 events
Tangier